Lit is the fourth studio album by the American rock band Lit. It was recorded at World Class Audio in Anaheim and The Pool House in Fullerton, California. It is the band's final album with all four original members, as drummer Allen Shellenberger died of malignant glioma in 2009.

Release
"Looks Like They Were Right" was released to radio on May 4, 2004. The album itself was released on June 22, 2004, and was the only album issued by the band's label Nitrus Records and DRT Entertainment. (During their three-year break, they left RCA Records.) "Times Like This" was released to radio on August 24, 2004, and again on September 21.

Reception

It peaked at #113 on the US Billboard 200 and #6 on the Top Independent Albums chart.

Track listing

Tracks released as non-LP B-sides
 "Over It"
 "Get Back"
 "No Turning Back" (Alternate version of "All Or Nothing")

Personnel
Lit
 A. Jay Popoff – lead vocals 
 Jeremy Popoff – guitar, backing vocals
 Kevin Baldes – bass, backing vocals
 Allen Shellenberger — drums, backing vocals

Additional musicians
 Gregg Coddington – Moog synthesizer (2)
 Jon Devoto – guitar solo (3)
 David Campbell – string arrangement (4)
 Jake Popoff – vocals (9)
 Gabrial McNair – piano (9), string arrangement (9)

References

Lit (band) albums
2004 albums
DRT Entertainment albums